The 2017 World Junior Short Track Speed Skating Championships took place from 27 to 29 January 2017 in Innsbruck, Austria.

Medal summary

Medal table

Men's events
The results of the Championships:

Women's events
The results of the Championships:

Participating nations

See also
Short track speed skating
World Junior Short Track Speed Skating Championships

References

External links
 Official website
Results book

World Junior Short Track Speed Skating Championships
World Junior Short Track Speed Skating Championships
World Junior Short Track Speed Skating Championships
International speed skating competitions hosted by Austria
Sports competitions in Innsbruck
World Junior Short Track Speed Skating Championships
World Junior Short Track Speed Skating Championships